Cortoon Shamrocks is a Gaelic Athletic Association club based in County Galway, Ireland. The club is a member of the Galway GAA. Galway league and championships and they compete at all levels of Galway football. Cortoon Shamrocks are a Gaelic football club

History

Cortoon are one of the oldest clubs in the county, and are unique in that they are the second senior football team in the one parish in Galway. Cortoon is a half parish of Tuam and with Tuam Stars , Cortoon success has been hard come by. They achieved Senior status in the early seventies in a team powered by Tommy Joe Gilmore and Mickey Rooney, they managed to reach the semi final on two occasions, losing to Caltra and Milltown. They then dropped again from senior status twice, but successfully fought hard to regain senior status. Cortoon is a half parish of Tuam.

2008 proved to be a memorable year in the history of Cortoon football. In the 2008 Galway Senior Football Championship, Cortoon started strongly by knocking out Annaghdown in the first round. Following that, they stunned reigning Champions Killererin, winning by a scoreline of 3-09 to 0-07. Taking confidence from such a great performance, Cortoon went on to defeat 2006 All-Ireland Club Champions Salthill-Knocknacarra by one point and in the club's third ever county semi final, they beat a highly fancied NUIG team by the same margin. They had reached their first ever Senior Football Final, and played Corofin in the decider. However, experience won through for Corofin as they won by 3 points in a tight contested final, 0-08 to 0-05.

Notable players include Derek Savage, former member of the county panel and a key part of Galway's 1998 and 2001 All-Ireland Football triumphs, and Michael Martin, All-Ireland Minor medal winner with Galway in 2007. Past legends include Tommy Joe Gilmore, voted centre half-back on the Galway "Team Of The Millennium".
Also Cathal Mulryan, Paul and Adrian Varley who all won the 2013 u21 All Ireland Final with Galway

Honours
 Galway Intermediate Football Championship: 3 (1999, 2003 2020)
 Galway Senior Championship Finalists 2008:
 Galway Senior Football League: 1 (2009)
 Galway Senior Football League B: (2011)
 John Dunne Cup Winners (2010):
 Galway Senior Championship semi-Finalists 2015:
 Galway Senior Championship semi-Finalists 2016:
 Galway Intermediate winners 2020:

Notable players
 Tommy Joe Gilmore
 Donal O'Neill
 Derek Savage
Michael Martin
David Warde
Adrian Varley
Paul Varley
Cathal Mulryan
Shane Gilmore
Jordan Rooney
Damien Cottle 
Francis Quinn
Joe Ryan
Dan Cottle

References

Gaelic football clubs in County Galway
Gaelic games clubs in County Galway
Sport in Tuam